Yariguianthus is a genus of flowering plants belonging to the family Asteraceae.

Its native range is Colombia.

Species:
 Yariguianthus glomerulatus S.Díaz & Rodr.-Cabeza

References

Asteraceae
Asteraceae genera